Emperor Gong of Song (2 November 1271 – 1323), personal name Zhao Xian, was the 16th emperor of the Song dynasty of China and the seventh emperor of the Southern Song dynasty. The sixth son of his predecessor, Emperor Duzong, Zhao Xian came to the throne around the age of four, and reigned for less than two years before he was forced to abdicate in 1276. He was succeeded by his fifth brother, Zhao Shi, enthroned as Emperor Duanzong.

Reign
Emperor Duzong died in 1274 from overindulgence in wine. His sixth son, Zhao Xian, who was then about four years old, was enthroned as the new emperor with assistance from the chancellor Jia Sidao. In the following year, Zhao Xian's grandmother (Grand Empress Dowager Xie) and mother (Empress Dowager Quan) became regents for the child emperor, although state and military power remained under Jia Sidao's control.

By the time Zhao Xian came to the throne, the Mongol-led Yuan dynasty had already taken control of the northern and southwestern areas of China, crossed the Yangtze River and acquired key strategic locations such as Xiangyang. They were heading towards the Song capital at Lin'an (present-day Hangzhou). Grand Empress Dowager Xie pursued a dual-strategy to the pending destruction of the Song dynasty: On one hand, she ordered the people to rally behind their emperor and save the Song Empire. On the other hand, she tried to make peace with the Yuan Empire. The Yuan army advanced further and captured Song territories and took control of various prefectures along the middle stretches of the Yangtze River.

In early 1275, Jia Sidao led an army of 30,000 to engage Yuan forces at Wuhu. The Song army suffered defeat and not long afterward, bowing to public pressure, Grand Empress Dowager Xie ordered Jia Sidao's execution. However, the move came too late and the fall of the Song dynasty loomed closer.

By the middle of 1275, the Yuan army had controlled most of the Jiangdong region, the southern part of present-day Jiangsu Province. On 18 January 1276, the Yuan general Bayan showed up with his army outside Lin'an. The Song imperial court sent Lu Xiufu to negotiate for peace with the enemy, but Lu was forced to surrender. Later that year, Grand Empress Dowager Xie brought the five-year-old Zhao Xian with her to the Yuan camp to surrender.

Historian Patricia Buckley Ebrey noted that the Yuan dynasty treated the Jurchen-led Jin dynasty's Wanyan imperial family harshly, totally butchering them by the hundreds as well as the emperor of Tangut-led Western Xia dynasty when they defeated him earlier. However Patricia also noted the Yuan dynasty were totally lenient on the Zhao imperial family of the Southern Song explicitly unlike the Jin dynasty in the Jingkang incident, sparing both the Southern Song royals in the capital Hangzhou like the Emperor Gong of Song and his mother as well as sparing the civilians inside it and not sacking the city, allowing them to go about their normal business, rehiring Southern Song officials. The Yuan dynasty did not take the Southern Song palace women for themselves but instead had Han artisans in Shangdu marry the palace women.

Remnants of the Song Empire fled southwards to Fujian and Guangdong provinces, where they continued to resist the Mongols. Zhao Xian's fifth brother, Zhao Shi, was enthroned as the new Emperor Duanzong. Zhao Shi died of illness in 1278 after fleeing the Mongols and was succeeded by his seventh brother, Zhao Bing.

In 1279, after the Battle of Yamen, Lu Xiufu brought Zhao Bing with him to Yashan (present-day Yamen, Guangdong Province), where they committed suicide by drowning themselves at sea. The death of Zhao Bing marked the end of the Song dynasty.

Ennoblement by the Yuan dynasty
After the fall of the Song dynasty, Zhao Xian was relocated to the Yuan capital at Dadu (present-day Beijing) then later to Shangdu. Some sources also claim that he lived in Qianzhou (謙州; present-day Tuva, Russia). His sojourns made him one of the most well-travelled Han emperors in Chinese history.

Journey to the Yuan capital
Soon after Zhao Xian surrendered, the Yuan general Bayan urged him to travel north for an audience with the Yuan founding emperor, Kublai Khan (Emperor Shizu). As a result, in March 1276, Zhao Xian left Lin'an (present-day Hangzhou) and proceeded towards Shangdu. Grand Empress Dowager Xie remained behind due to illness so he was accompanied northwards by Empress Dowager Quan, the Lady of Long (隆國夫人; Emperor Duzong's mother), Zhao Yurui (趙與芮; Emperor Lizong's younger brother and Zhao Xian’s grandfather), Zhao Naiyou (趙乃猷), and members of the privy council Gao Yinggong (高應松) and Xie Tang (謝堂). The former emperor's entourage also included Weng Zhongde (翁仲德), Wang Yuanliang (汪元量), and other palace officials.

After they crossed the Yangtze River, two former generals, Li Tingzhi (李庭芝) and Miao Zaicheng (苗再成), planned to hijack a transport to carry them all but failed. The group arrived in Dadu in May, and then proceeded to Shangdu, where Kublai Khan received them in the Hall of Great Peace (大安殿). Kublai conferred the noble title "Duke of Ying" (瀛國公) on Zhao Xian and a princess title on Zhao Xian's ethnic Mongol wife, Lady Borjigin. Kublai Khan further ordered that Zhao Xian and Lady Borjigin be given a residence in Dadu and receive preferential treatment. In 1298, Zhao Xian was given permission to move his residence to Shangdu. Between 1314 and 1320, the Yuan ruler Emperor Renzong received the Goryeo ruler Chungseon at his court. Chungseon asked to see visit Zhao Xian's residence and composed a song about him.

Relocation to Tibet
Kublai Khan wanted to preserve some vestiges of the Song imperial clan and in October 1288 issued an edict ordering Zhao Xian to relocate to Tibet. There, Zhao Xian was to study the Brahmana and Tibetan classics. Other sources claim that while in Tibet, Zhao Xian decided to study Buddhism instead. Kublai Khan's motive for this edict is unclear, as is whether such a relocation constituted a banishment. The Khan may have acted out of genuine concern for the former emperor or he may have wished to remove the Song heir to the throne out of China proper. In December 1288, Zhao Xian departed from Amdo (Wylie: mdo smad; Chinese: 朵思麻) in present-day Hainan Tibetan Autonomous Prefecture, for Ü-Tsang (Wylie: dbus gtsang; Chinese: 烏思藏) within the borders of present-day Tibet. He became a resident at the Sakya Monastery and was given the dharma name "Chos kyi Rin chen". Later on, Zhao Xian took over as the head monk at the monastery, translating Buddhist texts between the Chinese and Tibetan languages under the name "Sman rce Lha btsun" (Chinese: 蠻子合尊 manzihézūn), which means "royalty of Mangi" (southern barbarian) in Tibetan language.

Death
According to Sakya's monastic succession records, in 1323, the 52-year-old Zhao Xian received an imperial edict ordering him to commit suicide at Hexi (河西; present-day Zhangye, Gansu Province). Many Ming Historians believed that this was because Zhao Xian's poetry displeased the Yuan ruler, Emperor Yingzong. Other Ming historians believe that Emperor Yingzong feared a coup led by Zhao Xian. The renowned Sinologist Ann Paludan has written, "[His] unexplained suicide in 1323 led to curious rumours, including the suggestion that he was the real father of the future Mongol emperor Shundi (1333-1367), born to a Turkish woman in 1320."

Emperor Gong’s unofficial temple name is Gongzong (恭宗)

Family
Consorts and Issue:
 Lady, of the Borjigin clan 
 Zhao Wanpu, first son

Zhao Xian had one son with the Borjigin Mongol woman, Zhao Wanpu. Zhao Xian's son Zhao Wanpu was kept alive by the Yuan dynasty because of his mother's imperial Mongol Borjigin ancestry even after Zhao Xian was killed. Instead Zhao Wanpu was only moved and exiled. The outbreak of the Song loyalist Red Turban Rebellion in Henan led to a recommendation that Zhao Wanpu should be transferred somewhere else by an Imperial Censor in 1352. The Yuan did not want the ethnic Han rebels to get their hands on Zhao Wanpu so no one was permitted to see him and Zhao Wanpu's family and himself were exiled to Shazhou near the border by the Yuan emperor. Paul Pelliot and John Andrew Boyle commented on Rashid-al-Din Hamadani's chapter The Successors of Genghis Khan in his work Jami' al-tawarikh, identified references by Rashid al-Din to Zhao Xian in his book where he mentions a Chinese ruler who was an "emir" and son-in-law to the Qan (Khan) after being removed from his throne by the Yuan Empire and he is also called "Monarch of Song", or Suju (宋主 Songzhu) in the book.

According to a Ming story Zhao Xian had an affair with Yuan empress Mailaiti, a descendant of Arslan Khan of the Karluks, a wife of Yuan Emperor Mingzong. Zhao Xian allegedly fathered Yuan Emperor Huizong with Mailaiti. The Mongols circulated a similar story about the Yongle Emperor.

Ancestry

See also
 Chinese emperors family tree (middle)
 List of emperors of the Song dynasty
 Architecture of the Song dynasty
 Culture of the Song dynasty
 Economy of the Song dynasty
 History of the Song dynasty
 Society of the Song dynasty
 Technology of the Song dynasty

Notes

References

Citations

Sources

External links
  The Eighteen Emperors of the Song Dynasty

1271 births
1323 deaths
Southern Song emperors
13th-century Chinese monarchs
Monarchs deposed as children
Child monarchs from Asia
Yuan dynasty Buddhist monks
Chinese Buddhist monarchs
Yuan dynasty translators
Yuan dynasty poets
Writers from Hangzhou
Forced suicides of Chinese people
Executed Yuan dynasty people
People executed by the Yuan dynasty
Murdered Chinese emperors
Poets from Zhejiang
Monarchs taken prisoner in wartime
Heads of government who were later imprisoned
14th-century Chinese translators